Dream Babies Go Hollywood is a studio album released in 1980 by folk musician John Stewart, former member of the Kingston Trio. This was Stewart's first studio album since Bombs Away Dream Babies, his biggest commercial success as a solo musician.

Track listing
All compositions by John Stewart

 Side one
 "Hollywood Dreams" – 2:50
 "Wind on the River" – 4:16
 "Wheels of Thunder" – 3:25
 "Monterey" – 3:23
 "(Odin) Spirit of the Water" – 4:35
 Side two
 "Lady of Fame" – 4:13
 "The Raven" – 4:45
 "Love Has Tied My Wings" – 3:17
 "Nightman" – 3:28
 "Moonlight Rider" – 1:48

Personnel
 John Stewart – vocals, guitar, percussion
 Chris Whelan – bass guitar, vocals
 Joey Carbone – keyboards
 Henry Diltz – vocals
 Phil Everly – vocals
 Sydney Fox – vocals
 Jo Ann Harris – vocals
 Nicolette Larson – vocals
 Linda Ronstadt – vocals
 Blaise Tosti – vocals
 Wendy Waldman – vocals
 Russ Kunkel – drums, percussion
 David Platshon – drums
 Steve Ross – percussion

Charts

References

External links
  John Stewart's Official Website

1980 albums
John Stewart (musician) albums
RSO Records albums